Jackeline Olivier (born 29 September 1977) is a Brazilian actress. She has worked in such films as Fast Five and Rio 2.

Her other roles include the horror film Day of the Dead 2: Contagium and as Chi Chi in the ensemble romantic-comedy, Flick's Chicks.

Early life
Jackeline Olivier was born in Porto Alegre. She was raised Catholic. She began her career early acting in school plays and appeared in some commercials. Olivier's first commercial, at 17, was modeling for a clothing store. When she was 22, she moved to São Paulo to pursue acting. She speaks fluent Portuguese and English.

Filmography

References

External links
 

1977 births
Expatriate actresses in the United States
Brazilian expatriates in the United States
Brazilian film actresses
Brazilian television actresses
Brazilian voice actresses
Living people
People from Porto Alegre
20th-century Brazilian actresses
21st-century Brazilian actresses